PixelJunk is a series of downloadable games developed by Q-Games. The series made its debut on PlayStation 3 with PixelJunk Racers, released July 11, 2007.

The series was published internationally by Sony Computer Entertainment for PlayStation platforms until 2012, with Q-Games themselves publishing on other platforms and for PlayStation in Japan. Spike Chunsoft took over worldwide publishing for PixelJunk Monsters 2 in 2018.

Development

PixelJunk is developed by Q-Games, headed by Dylan Cuthbert. The series began in 2007 with the release of PixelJunk Racers. While Racers was met with modest critical and commercial reception, 2008 and 2009 saw the releases of the more popular, critically acclaimed titles PixelJunk Monsters, PixelJunk Eden and PixelJunk Shooter.

In an interview at TGS 2009, Q-Games stated that proper development on PixelJunk 1-5 would start in 2010. A PixelJunk title known tentatively as PixelJunk Dungeons, and was in the conceptual phase of production in 2008. Q-Games officially revealed PixelJunk 1-5 as PixelJunk Lifelike on September 16, 2010 during the SCEI's 2010 Tokyo Game Show conference. However, it was later renamed PixelJunk 4am. It is unclear if PixelJunk Dungeons is still under development.

On May 18, 2010 PixelJunk Shooter 2 was revealed on the official PlayStation blog due for release in 2011.

Games

Series 1
The first series of PixelJunk games are all described by Q-Games president Dylan Cuthbert as having "simplicity, familiarity, and originality" in common. Games in the first series are also two-dimensional and run in 1080p HD at 60fps.

Series 2
The second series was planned concurrently with the first. In 2008, Cuthbert suggested that games of the second series could "take some of the old 3D looks and bring them up to the full HD kind of style." He later confirmed Series 2 would "venture into aesthetically pleasing 3D."

Mobile games

PixelJunk VR

PixelJunk Museum
On September 24, 2009, Q-Games released a virtual space for PlayStation Home. Titled PixelJunk Museum (PixelJunk Exhibition in North America), the space included virtual displays for PixelJunk Racers, PixelJunk Monsters, and PixelJunk Eden, as well as a virtual gift shop where users could buy PixelJunk and Q Games-branded Home items. A separate "room" featuring the interior of the "Ers Piñita Colada" space center from PixelJunk Shooter was added to the space on December 17, 2009 in the NA region.

The Japanese version of the space included an exclusive "Q-Games virtual public TGS Booth" — a recreation of the Q-Games booth at the 2009 Tokyo Games Show where users could claim a free T-shirt for their Home avatar.

References

External links
PixelJunk official website
Q-Games official website

Video game franchises introduced in 2007
Video game franchises

de:Q-Games#PixelJunk